Bill Aron is an American photographer known as an environmental portrait photographer and a chronicler of Jewish communities around the world. Aron's photographs have been exhibited in major museums and galleries throughout the United States and Israel, including the Museum of Modern Art, the International Center for Photography, the Jewish Museum, the Chicago Art Institute, the Boston Museum of Fine Arts, the Mississippi Museum of Art, the Israel Museum in Jerusalem, and the Museum of the Diaspora in Tel-Aviv.

Background 
Bill Aron's first book, From the Corners of the Earth, (1986) features photographs of Jews living in the Soviet Union, Cuba, Jerusalem, New York, and Los Angeles. The book's introduction was written by Chaim Potok.  In 2002, Aron published Shalom Y'All, focusing on Jews in the Deep South including, Mississippi, Louisiana, Arkansas, Alabama and South Carolina. That book featured an introduction by Alfred Uhry.

New Beginnings: The Triumphs of 120 Cancer Survivors (2015 Skyhorse Publishing) features a collection of narratives and photographic portraits of men, women, children, and families of varied ages and ethnicities who have faced and survived cancer. The book's introduction was written by Jane Brody.

Bibliography
 From the Corners of the Earth, 1986, 
 Shalom Y'All, 2002, 
 New Beginnings: The Triumphs of 120 Cancer Survivors, 2015,

Exhibitions
 2012 - Forever Young, Forever Old | Boston | Pucker Gallery
 2005 - Bagels and Grits: Exploring Jewish Life in the Deep South | Maine | Bates College Multicultural Center

References

External links
 Aron's website

American photographers
Living people
Year of birth missing (living people)